Saint-Front-sur-Nizonne (literally Saint-Front on Nizonne) is a commune in the Dordogne department in Nouvelle-Aquitaine in southwestern France.

In 1912, the commune of Saint-Front-de-Champniers changed its name to Saint-Front-sur-Nizonne.

Geography
The Lizonne, also called Nizonne, flows west through the middle of the commune.

Population

See also
Communes of the Dordogne department

References

Communes of Dordogne